Tyruss Gerald Himes (November 22, 1968 –  December 5, 2016), better known by his stage names Big Syke and Mussolini, was an American rapper best known for his work with the American hip-hop groups Thug Life and Outlawz. His stage name "Big Syke" is a revision of his childhood nickname "Little Psycho". He died at his home in Hawthorne, California on December 5, 2016.

Career
In 1990, Big Syke and fellow rappers Domino and Mental Illness started a hip-hop group named Evil Mind Gangstas. In 1992 he met rapper Tupac "2Pac" Shakur and joined 2Pac's rap group Thug Life. In 1995 he joined 2Pac's second rap group The Outlaw Immortalz as Mussolini and recorded songs for 2Pac's 1996 album All Eyez on Me, including "Picture Me Rollin'", "When We Ride", "All Eyez on Me", and "Check Out Time".

Death
Big Syke died at his home in Hawthorne, California on December 5, 2016, at the age of 48 from natural causes.

Discography

Studio albums
Be Yo' Self (October 15, 1996, Parole / RideOnUm Records)
Big Syke Daddy (September 25, 2001, D3 Entertainment / RideOnUm Records)
Street Commando (May 21, 2002, Riviera / RideOnUm Records)
Big Syke (October 22, 2002, Rap-a-Lot / RideOnUm Records)

Collaboration albums
With Evil Mind Gangsta's - All Hell Breakin' Loose (1992, Organize Records)
With Thug Life - Thug Life Vol. 1 (September 26, 1994, Out Da Gutta / Interscope)

Compilation albums
Thug Law: Thug Life Outlawz Chapter 1 (October 23, 2001, D3 Entertainment / RideOnUm Records)
Thug Law: Thug Life Outlawz Chapter 2 (September 2, 2003, RideOnUm Records)

Mixtapes
Thug Life: Demo Tape (with Thug Life) (1994, Intercope)
Big Syke: Volume 1 (July 27, 2007, Ghost Label)
Big Syke: Reincarnated Volume 1 (2007, Self-released)

Guest appearances

References

External links
 
 
 Big Syke on Vimeo
 Interview with Anton Batey

1968 births
2016 deaths
African-American male rappers
American male rappers
Burials at Inglewood Park Cemetery
Crips
Gangsta rappers
G-funk artists
Musicians from Inglewood, California
Outlawz members
Rappers from Los Angeles
West Coast hip hop musicians
20th-century African-American people
21st-century African-American people